Higher Than Rainbow or  is a 1986 Soviet television musical film directed by Georgi Yungvald-Khilkevich.

Plot
Schoolboy Alik Rainbow lives in a creative family (his father is a musician and composer, mother is a choreographer) which has made him a dreamer and a poet. Studying is very easy for Alik, but there is one problem: Rainbow is not able to jump high, and therefore is among the worst in gym class.

In his fantasies Alik floats on the table like a gondola on the sea and communicates with the Siren, who suddenly offers Rainbow to fulfill his innermost desire. Without hesitating, Alik asks to be gifted with the ability to jump up at any height. Siren performs the boy's request, but stipulates one condition: if Rainbow ever tells a single lie, the gift will disappear immediately!

Endowed with the magic force Alik becomes a hit in gym class. The overwhelmed teacher immediately sends Rainbow to the athletics sports team. But wanting to bail out a girl whom Alik loves, Rainbow lies, the gift disappears and now Alik can not even jump through a straw ...

The situation could be remedied by using the help of Ivan Ivanovich. This is the legendary Ivan the Fool, whom the evil witch turned into a stump. During his walks, Alik finds this stump, carves a wooden figure from it, and thus revives Ivan Ivanovich. They have a lot of fun talking and Ivan Ivanovich constantly offers to help Rainbow. But Alik decides to reach the heights of sport by himself, with the help of tedious training rather than magical power ...

Cast
 Dmitry Maryanov – Alik Rainbow (voice by Dmitry Kharatyan, singing by Vladimir Presnyakov Jr.)
 Mikhail Boyarsky – Alik's father
 Elena Aminova – Alik's mother
 Ekaterina Parfyonova – Dasha, Alik's classmate (singing by Victoria Vradiy)
 Yuri Kuklachev – Ivan Ivanovich (voice by Mikhail Kononov)
 Olga Mashnaya – Butyrina Irina Mikhailovna (BIM), physical training teacher (voice by Olga Gromova)
 Tatiana Basova – Svetlana Mikhailovna, history teacher / Siren (voice by Inga Tretyakova, singing by Alla Pugacheva)
 Galina Polskikh – Alexandra Ilinichna, coach
 Anatoliy Krasnik – Borshev, Alik's classmate
 Yuri Khoroshilov – Fokin, Alik's classmate
 Elena Popova – Lenochka
 Yuri Rudchenko – foreman
 Yuri Senkevich – cameo
 Rait Ozols – Valery Paschenko

Soundtrack
The film became very popular in the Soviet Union because of the numerous musical numbers (songwriters composer Yury Chernavsky and poet Leonid Derbenyov), directed in the music video format, and it is with this film began the popularity of Vladimir Presnyakov Jr., who sung all of the protagonist's songs. Several songs were performed by Mikhail Boyarsky, and one of the songs by Alla Pugacheva.

"Siren" (Сирена) - Alla Pugacheva
"The Cat in the bag" (Кот в мешке) - Vladimir Presnyakov Jr.
"Only once" (Только раз) - Mikhail Boyarsky
"Photographer" (Фотограф) - Vladimir Presnyakov Jr., on the record, Mikhail Boyarsky.
"Song of the deaf pirate" (Песня глухого пирата) - Mikhail Boyarsky
"Zurbagan" (Зурбаган) - Vladimir Presnyakov Jr.
"Glass World" (Стеклянный мир) - Michael Boyarsky, Victoria Vradiy
"Islands" (Острова) - Vladimir Presnyakov Jr.

The song "Zurbagan" refers to the city of the same name in the fantasy world of Grinlandia in the novels and short stories of Alexander Grin.

References

External links

Soviet musical films
1980s musical films
Soviet television films
Soviet teen films